In metric geometry, an injective metric space, or equivalently a hyperconvex metric space, is a metric space with certain properties generalizing those of the real line and of L∞ distances in higher-dimensional vector spaces. These properties can be defined in two seemingly different ways: hyperconvexity involves the intersection properties of closed balls in the space, while injectivity involves the isometric embeddings of the space into larger spaces. However it is a theorem of  that these two different types of definitions are equivalent.

Hyperconvexity 

A metric space  is said to be hyperconvex if it is convex and its closed balls have the binary Helly property. That is:
Any two points  and  can be connected by the isometric image of a line segment of length equal to the distance between the points (i.e.  is a path space).

Injectivity 

A retraction of a metric space  is a function  mapping  to a subspace of itself, such that
 for all  we have that ; that is,  is the identity function on its image (i.e. it is idempotent), and
 for all  we have that ; that is,  is nonexpansive.
A retract of a space  is a subspace of  that is an image of a retraction.

Examples 

Examples of hyperconvex metric spaces include
 The real line
  with the ∞ distance
 Manhattan distance (L1) in the plane (which is equivalent up to rotation and scaling to the L∞), but not in higher dimensions
 The tight span of a metric space
 Any complete real tree
  – see Metric space aimed at its subspace
Due to the equivalence between hyperconvexity and injectivity, these spaces are all also injective.

Properties 

Thus, injective spaces satisfy a particularly strong form of Jung's theorem.

Every injective space is a complete space, and every metric map (or, equivalently, nonexpansive mapping, or short map) on a bounded injective space has a fixed point. A metric space is injective if and only if it is an injective object in the category of metric spaces and metric maps.

Notes

References 
 Correction (1957), Pacific J. Math. 7: 1729, .

Metric geometry